Dholera is a village in Ahmedabad district of Gujarat state in India.

History
Dholera was also an ancient port-city in Gulf of Khambhat, 30 km. from Dhandhuka village of Ahmedabad district. Shri Swaminarayan Mandir, Dholera is one of the nine temples built by Swaminarayan.

Since 2011, the Government of Gujarat has been making plans to develop a smart city at Bhal area. The economic viability of the project has been questioned by farmer organisations. Several investors who initially signed the Memorandum of Understanding to develop the project, have withdrawn and refused to invest.

Geography
The region is located in a low lying area and is flood prone. In August 2019, the area was waterlogged and remained cut off from other cities for three days.

Planned infrastructure 
Gujarat Government has proposed a new International Airport for Ahmedabad city at Fedara. The proposed international airport is to be strategically located near the planned SEZ project of the Adani Group at Dholera. A new seaport was initially proposed, but the plans have been abandoned. 

In January 2021 a monorail project to link Ahmedabad and the Dholera Special Investment Region (DSIR) was approved. The Rs 6,000 crore Mass Rapid Transit System (MRTS) will run parallel to the expressway and have seventy stations.

References

History of Gujarat
Swaminarayan Sampradaya
Villages in Ahmedabad district
Proposed infrastructure in Gujarat
Economy of Gujarat
Planned cities in India
Settlements in Gujarat